Alexander Williams MBE (born 13 November 1961) is an English former football goalkeeper. He won the UEFA European Under-21 Championship with England in 1984.

He made 125 league and cup appearances for Manchester City between 1980 and 1986, and also had brief spells with Queen of the South and Port Vale. He helped City to win promotion out of the Second Division in 1984–85. However, he was forced into early retirement in September 1987 due to a recurring back injury. He continued to work behind the scenes at Manchester City, and in 2002 received an MBE for services to young people.

Club career
A Moss Side native and product of the Manchester City youth scheme, he featured in both the FA Youth Cup finals of 1979 and 1980, which ended in defeats to Millwall and Aston Villa respectively. He graduated out of the Academy alongside players such as Gary Bennett and Tommy Caton. He made his first team debut in the 1980–81 season, and impressed enough so as to permanently succeeded Joe Corrigan in the City goal. Following mid-table finishes in the 1980–81 and 1981–82 seasons under manager John Bond, City were relegated out of the First Division in 1982–83 under new boss John Benson. Now under the stewardship of Billy McNeill, they finished fourth in the Second Division in 1983–84, missing out on promotion by a ten-point margin. Despite this, Williams was voted onto the PFA Team of the Year, along with teammate Mick McCarthy. Promotion was instead achieved in 1984–85, after they secured the third and final promotion place by beating fourth placed Portsmouth's goal difference tally. The "Citizens" re-established themselves in the top-flight with a 15th-place finish in 1985–86. However, he lost his first team place to Eric Nixon, and fell further down the pecking order with the arrival of Perry Suckling. His last game for the club was a 3–0 home defeat to rivals Manchester United. Williams played a total of 125 league games in his six years at Maine Road. He also played five games on loan at Scottish club Queen of the South in 1986.

In November 1986 he was sent out on loan to Port Vale, who needed cover for an injured Mark Grew, and was signed permanently by manager John Rudge in January 1987 for a £10,000 fee (plus 50% of any future transfer fees). He settled in well at Vale Park, and made 31 Third Division appearances in 1986–87. However, he featured just six times at the start of the 1987–88 campaign when he was forced into retirement in September 1987 due to a recurring back injury.

International career 
Williams was a member of the England Under-21 squad that won the 1984 UEFA European Under-21 Championship.

Post-retirement
Williams returned to Port Vale in July 1988 as the community programme officer but departed in January 1990 to take up a similar role at Manchester City. He now works as the Executive Manager of City in the Community, Manchester City's community programme. He was awarded the MBE in the 2002 New Years Honours list for his services to young people.

Career statistics
Source:

A.  The "Other" column constitutes appearances and goals in the League Cup, Football League Trophy, Football League play-offs and Full Members Cup.

Honours
England U21
UEFA European Under-21 Championship: 1984

Manchester City
FA Youth Cup runner-up: 1979 & 1980
Football League Second Division third-place promotion: 1984–85

Individual
PFA Team of the Year (Second Division): 1983–84

References

1961 births
Living people
People from Moss Side
Footballers from Manchester
Black British sportsmen
English footballers
England youth international footballers
Association football goalkeepers
Manchester City F.C. players
Queen of the South F.C. players
Port Vale F.C. players
English Football League players
Scottish Football League players
Members of the Order of the British Empire
Port Vale F.C. non-playing staff